Suiattle Glacier is located in the Glacier Peak Wilderness in the U.S. state of Washington. The glacier is within Mount Baker-Snoqualmie National Forest and nearly touches Honeycomb and White River glaciers separated from them by an arête off the Kololo Peaks at its uppermost reaches. Suiattle Glacier has retreated significantly since the end of the Little Ice Age, and from approximately the years 1850 to 1924 lost  of its length. After this, Suiattle Glacier began to retreat again and has retreated 270 m (886 ft) from its advanced position in the 1970s to 2009.

See also
List of glaciers in the United States

References

Glaciers of Glacier Peak
Glaciers of Washington (state)